A pocket track, tail track, or reversing siding (UK: centre siding, turnback siding) is a rail track layout which allows trains to park off the main line.  This type of track layout differs from a passing loop in that the pocket track is usually located between two main lines, rather than off to the side.

Pocket tracks also allow for the short-turning of trains, truncating services at an intermediate station to control train frequency. They are also used at terminal stations to allow for the construction of future extension of a rail track without disrupting existing service.

References

Railway sidings